Lin Hanying (born ) is a retired Chinese female volleyball player. She was part of the China women's national volleyball team.

She participated in the 1997 FIVB Volleyball World Grand Prix.

References

External links
http://en.people.cn/english/200103/01/eng20010301_63765.html

1978 births
Living people
Chinese women's volleyball players
Place of birth missing (living people)